Komaram Bheem is a 1990 Telugu language biographical film directed by Allani Sridhar, It is based on the early 20th century tribal leader Komaram Bheem and stars Bhoopal Reddy as the titular character.

The film turned out to be a commercial as well as critical success. The film two Nandi Awards including Best Film on National Integration and Best First Film of a Director for Sridhar.

Plot
The film follows the struggle of Gond Tribals the 1940s in Adilabad district against the oppressive rule of the Nizam. It focuses on the real life hero, Komaram Bheem, who led the resistance.

Cast
 Bhoopal Reddy as Komaram Bheem
 Mounika as Komaram Bheem's wife
 Bank Prasad

Release
The film was commercially released in July 2010, nearly 20 years of its production. The film ran for 100 days at a few locations Hyderabad.

Awards
Nandi Awards - 1990
Best Film on National Integration - Aadhi Vasi Chitra Brundham
Best First Film of a Director - Allani Sridhar

See also
RRR (2022), a fictional film depicting Komaram Bheem and his contemporary Alluri Sitarama Raju

References

2010s Telugu-language films
Indian biographical films
History of India on film
Films set in Telangana
History of Telangana
2010s biographical films
1990 films